Astragalus asciocalyx is a species of milkvetch in the family Fabaceae.

References

asciocalyx
Taxa named by Alexander von Bunge